Benjamin 'Ben' Mark Wellington (born 30 April 1974) is a former English cricketer.  Wellington was a right-handed batsman who bowled right-arm medium pace.  He was born at Taunton, Somerset.

Wellington represented the Somerset Cricket Board in a single List A match against Bedfordshire in the 2nd round of the 1999 NatWest Trophy at the County Ground, Taunton.  In his only List A match, he scored an unbeaten 5 runs.

References

External links
Ben Wellington at Cricinfo
Ben Wellington at CricketArchive

1974 births
Living people
Sportspeople from Taunton
Cricketers from Somerset
English cricketers
Somerset Cricket Board cricketers